St. Augustine's may refer to:

Places
 St Augustine's (electoral ward), an electoral ward in Penarth, Wales
 Bay of Saint-Augustin, Madagascar

Places of Worship
St. Augustine's Church (disambiguation)
St. Augustine Catholic Church (disambiguation)
St. Augustine Catholic Church and Cemetery (disambiguation)
St Augustine's Abbey (disambiguation)
Cathedral of Saint Augustine (disambiguation)

Schools
St. Augustine High School (disambiguation)
St. Augustine's College (disambiguation)
Saint Augustine Elementary School (disambiguation)
St Augustine of Canterbury School (disambiguation)
St. Augustine Catholic High School (disambiguation)
Saint Augustine School (Laredo, Texas), United States
St. Augustine's Catholic School (Culver City, California), United States
St. Augustine's School, Kalimpong, Philippines
Saint Augustine School, Tanza, Philippines
St Augustine of Canterbury Catholic Primary School (Gillingham, Kent), England
St Augustine's Day School, Kolkata, India
St. Augustine's Day School, Shyamnagar, West Bengal, India
St. Augustines School (Vasai), India

See also
Saint Augustine (disambiguation)